Don Williams Volume Two is the second LP by American country singer and songwriter Don Williams. Released in January of 1974 on the JMI Records label, the album reached number thirteen on the US Country Albums Chart. "Atta Way to Go" was released in 1973 as a single preceding the album, and "We Should Be Together" and "Down the Road I Go" were released as singles in 1974.

Background 
Williams was no stranger to the country music scene, having been a member of the Texas band The Pozo Seco Singers from 1964-1970. He left the music industry briefly, but returned in 1973 with his solo debut, Don Williams Volume One. Williams had signed with JMI records initially as a songwriter, but later at the encouragement of its founder, Jack Clement, recorded a full length album produced by songwriter Allen Reynolds. It was a strong debut, reaching number five on the 1973 Country Albums Chart, and it had two top 20 country singles.

Six months after the release of his debut album, the formula for success was repeated for Don Williams Volume Two, including producer Allen Reynolds, and many of the same A-Team Nashville studio musicians, notably steel guitarist Lloyd Green, fiddle player Buddy Spicher and drummer Kenny Malone.

Legacy 
This would be Williams' final recording with JMI records, which was sold to ABC-DOT Records shortly after the release of the album.

Allen Reynolds would go on to produce and write many successful country songs, including many of Crystal Gayle's biggest hits from the 1970s and 1980s. The song "We Should Be Together," written by Reynolds, would go on to be the title track off of Gayle's 1976 country record.

Track listing 
from the original JMI Records release:

Side A

 "Wish I Was in Nashville" (Bob McDill) - 2:25
 "Your Sweet Love" (Don Williams) - 2:39
 "She's in Love with a Rodeo Man" (McDill) - 3:10
 "Atta Way to Go" (Williams) - 2:47
 "We Should Be Together" (Allen Reynolds) - 3:02

Side B

 "Loving You So Long" (Reynolds) - 2:47
 "Oh Misery" (Williams) - 3:40
 "Millers Cave" (Jack Clement) - 2:37
 "I Don't Think About Her No More" (Mickey Newbury) - 3:50
 "Down the Road I Go" (Williams) - 3:07

Musicians 
from the original album liner notes:
Don Williams - lead vocals, guitar
The Joyful Noise - "gentle voices" backing vocals
Bobby Thompson - banjo
Joe Allen - bass guitar
Lloyd Green - Dobro, steel guitar 
Kenny Malone - drums
Buddy Spicher, Johnny Gimble, Lisa Silver - fiddle
Bobby Thompson, Chip Young, Jimmy Colvard - guitar
Danny Flowers - harpoonist harmonica
Chuck Cochran - keyboards
Johnny Gimble - mandolin
Jimmy Colvard - "Boogie beats"

Production 
from the original album liner notes:

Producer – Allen Reynolds
Engineer – Curt Allen, Garth Fundis, Ronnie Dean
Arranged – Charles Cochran
Photography – John Donegan
Lighting Director – Jack Clement

References 

Don Williams albums
1974 albums
Albums produced by Allen Reynolds
ABC Records albums
Dot Records albums